Qiangwan is a township of Baiyin District, Baiyin City, Gansu, China. In 2017 it had a population of 8210. It governs over 1 residential community and 7 administrative villages. The township is located in a hilly area between the basin of Baiyin city and the Yellow River valley. The township mainly relies on growing wheat and corn.

A Qijia culture site has been found in Qiangwan.

References 

Township-level divisions of Gansu